The core discography of supergroup Crosby, Stills, Nash & Young consists of eight studio albums, five live albums, six compilation albums, four video albums, and 19 singles. Originally formed in 1968, the group released one album as the trio Crosby, Stills & Nash before recruiting Neil Young into the band for their first concerts in 1969. Of the band's eight studio albums, three have also included Young; and of the group's numerous tours, the quartet configuration has made concert tours in 1969, 1970, 1974, 2000, 2002, and 2006.

The group's second album, Déjà Vu, remains the group's most successful album, selling over eight million copies. All of the group members were songwriters with some of their biggest hits—"Suite: Judy Blue Eyes", "Teach Your Children", and "Ohio"—being written by Stills, Nash, and Young respectively. The group has also recorded songs by other writers, such as the hit single "Woodstock" written by Joni Mitchell. All members pursued careers independent of the group. As solo artists, Crosby and Nash have each earned one gold record, Stills has three, the pair of Crosby and Nash also three, and a one-time pair of Stills and Young has one, whilst Young has multiple gold and platinum albums in his discography. The trio configuration has sold around 13 million albums, while the quartet has sold around 20 million. Combined sales of the group including solo, duo, trio and quartet versions is over 70 million.

Albums

Studio albums

Live albums

Compilation albums

Soundtrack appearances

Singles 

 Non-album single later included on 1974 So Far compilation

Guest singles

Videos

Video albums

Music videos

Other appearances

References

External links
 
 
 

Discographies of American artists
Discographies of Canadian artists
Folk music discographies
Rock music group discographies
Discography